The Ireland men's national basketball team represents the island of Ireland in international basketball. It is governed by Basketball Ireland with players from both the Republic of Ireland and Northern Ireland. Ireland plays their home matches at the National Basketball Arena in Tallaght, Dublin.

Ireland has little history on the international stage, as they have yet to qualify for top tournaments such as the EuroBasket or the FIBA World Cup. However, the national team did manage to reach the Summer Olympics once, in 1948.

History

The Amateur Basketball Association of Ireland (ABAI; now Basketball Ireland) was formed in 1945 and affiliated to FIBA in 1947. An indoor version of basketball had been played in the Irish Army from 1936, but using non-standard rules to create an indoor winter substitute for Gaelic football; until 1943, the Army Athletic Council officially recognized only Gaelic games. The ABAI sent a team of the best Army players to the 1948 Olympic tournament in nearby London, despite the refusal of Army command to release the players for intensive training. The team coaches were officers unfamiliar with the sport, who outranked the players and ignored their advice. Although many top sides were absent from the London Games in the aftermath of World War II, the Irish team finished last, losing every match heavily; the worst a 71–9 loss to Mexico, who finished fourth.

The team's standard improved gradually from the 1970s to the 2000s, as more school leavers won scholarships to play US college basketball, and some Irish American professional players took up eligibility to compete for their ancestral country. Ireland entered European-zone Olympic qualification tournaments in 1972, 1976, 1984, and 1988, losing every match each time. In 1988, Ireland finished runner-up in the inaugural Promotion Cup, the third tier of EuroBasket, later named EuroBasket Division C, and now the FIBA European Championship for Small Countries. In 1993, the National Basketball Arena opened in Dublin, which became the team's new permanent home.  Division C was hosted there the following year, and Ireland beat Cyprus 81–78 in the final to gain promotion to EuroBasket Division B. Ireland narrowly failed to win promotion to Division A in FIBA EuroBasket 2005 Division B, losing to Denmark by 4 points after having won the first game in Dublin by 10 points.

In February 2010, during the Irish financial crisis, Basketball Ireland announced that it was €1.2m in debt and was deactivating its senior international squads to cut costs. In December 2015, the team was reactivated for 2016.

In December 2015, it was announced that Ireland would play at the 2016 FIBA European Championship for Small Countries. The team finished in the fourth position overall.

Ireland played in the 2018 FIBA European Championship for Small Countries, held in San Marino from 26 June to 1 July. Ireland finished (1–1) in group play, losing to Malta then defeating Andorra. In the semi-finals Ireland lost to Norway, sending the team to the bronze medal match where they defeated Gibraltar to finish in third place.

Three years later, Ireland hosted the 2021 FIBA European Championship for Small Countries in Dublin. The national team would go undefeated during the tournament at (4–0), to capture their second title at the competition all time.

Competitive record

FIBA World Cup

Olympic Games

Championship for Small Countries

EuroBasket

Results and fixtures

2021

2022

Team

Current roster
Roster for the EuroBasket 2025 Pre-Qualifiers matches on 30 June and 3 July 2022 against Austria and Switzerland.

Depth chart

Head coach position
/ Jay Larrañaga – (2008–2010)
 Mark Keenan – (2014)
 Colin O'Reilly – (2015)
 Pete Strickland – (2016–2018)
 Mark Keenan – (2019–present)

Notable players
Cal Bowdler – NBA player for the Atlanta Hawks, but not born in Ireland
Pat Burke – Only Irish-born to have played in the NBA, played for the Orlando Magic & Phoenix Suns. Also a Euroleague and ULEB Eurocup winner with Panathinaikos and Real Madrid
Marty Conlon – NBA player for the Seattle SuperSonics, Sacramento Kings, Charlotte Hornets, Washington Bullets, Milwaukee Bucks, Boston Celtics, Miami Heat, and Los Angeles Clippers,  but not born in Ireland
Billy Donlon – former head coach of the Wright State University men's basketball team and as of 2019 head coach of UMKC.
Aidan Igiehon – former Louisville and current Grand Canyon player
Jay Larrañaga – former captain of the Ireland national team
Donnie McGrath – Irish American, he played for Anadolu Efes, Spartak St. Petersburg and Žalgiris Kaunas amongst others
Darren Randolph – Irish football goalkeeper and player for the Republic of Ireland national team, father Ed Randolph was an American who played basketball in Ireland. He taught his son basketball and Darren has since represented the national team

Past rosters
1948 Olympic Games: finished 23rd among 23 teams

4 Donald O'Donovan, 5 Frank O'Connor, 6 Paddy Crehan, 7 Jimmy McGee, 8 Bill Jackson, 9 Harry Boland, 10 Tommy Keenan, 12 Dermot Sheriff, 13 Danny Reddin, 14 Paddy Sheriff, 15 Jim Flynn, 16 Christy Walsh (Coach: Donald McCormack)

2016 FIBA European Championship for Small Countries: finished 4th among 8 teams

2018 FIBA European Championship for Small Countries: finished 3rd  among 7 teams

2021 FIBA European Championship for Small Countries: finished 1st  among 5 teams

Kit

Manufacturer
2016: Macron

See also

Sport in Ireland
Ireland women's national basketball team
Ireland men's national under-20 basketball team
Ireland men's national under-18 basketball team
Ireland men's national under-16 basketball team
Ireland men's national 3x3 team
Super League

References

External links

Official website
Ireland FIBA profile
Ireland National Team – Men at Eurobasket.com
Ireland Basketball Records at FIBA Archive

 
 
Men's national basketball teams
1947 establishments in Ireland
Basketball teams established in 1947